Scared to Death may refer to:
 Voodoo death, literally dying of fright or other emotional response
 Scared to Death (1947 film), a horror film starring Béla Lugosi
 Scared to Death (1981 film), a 1981 horror/science fiction film directed by William Malone
 "Scared to Death" (Criminal Minds), an episode of Criminal Minds
 "Scared to Death" (song), a 2012 song by HIM
 Scared To Death  (podcast) by Dan and Lynze Cummins